Surseni is a village in the Unnao district of Uttar Pradesh, India on the Lucknow-Bangarmau Road about 2 km from Bangarmau (Tehsil Sub-District), 50 km from Unnao, 25 km from Safipur and 40 km from city of Kannauj. It is approximately 600 years old. The population was approximately 11,000 as of the 2011 census.

Mosques 

Surseni has seven mosques, the oldest of which, Jama Masjid, is over 500 years old and an example of Mughal architecture.

Gallery

Education  
Surseni has four madrasas, two government schools and three private schools where many of the students come from other villages.

Transportation 
There are public and private buses in the village and a railway station within 2 km. Lucknow Airport	is about 45 km away.

External links 
Information about Surseni

Cities and towns in Unnao district